Terrance M. Serpico is an American film and television actor.

Personal Life
Serpico was born in Fort Sill in Lawton, Oklahoma, the youngest of three children. He became interested in acting after graduating from high school. He attended Boston University before transferring to and graduating from the State University of New York at Purchase in 1989. He is of German and Italian descent.
Serpico married Kadia Saraf on June 8, 2022, in Beacon, New York. They met on set of Law & Order: Special Victims Unit.

Career

Serpico began his career as a stunt performer. In 1997, he was cast in his first major acting role in Donnie Brasco. In television, Serpico has guest-starred on such shows as Law & Order, CSI: Miami, Law & Order: Criminal Intent, and Person of Interest.

He played Mickey Mantle in the ESPN miniseries The Bronx Is Burning. He has enjoyed a recurring role in Rescue Me, and a starring role as  Col. Frank Sherwood in Army Wives.

Serpico appears in a recurring role as New York Special Victims Unit Chief Tommy McGrath on Law & Order: Special Victims Unit.

Filmography

References

External links

Interview with Terry Serpico at WickedInfo.com

Living people
American male film actors
American male television actors
American people of German descent
American people of Italian descent
American stunt performers
Male actors from Oklahoma
People from Fort Sill, Oklahoma
State University of New York at Purchase alumni
Year of birth missing (living people)